The state highways are arterial routes of a state, linking district headquarters and important towns within the state and connecting them with national highways or Highways of the neighboring states.

Introduction
Chhattisgarh state has a good road network. There are 20 national highways with total length of 512 km and many state highways with total length of 4,136.85 km.

Type of road and its length

List of state highways

References 

Lists of roads in India